Aïn Fares is a town and commune in Mascara Province, Algeria. According to the 1998 census it has a population of 12,454.

References

Communes of Mascara Province